Laurel is a unisex given name. The name is of English origin from the Latin Lauras with the meaning referring to the laurel tree. Various names related to Laurel are Laura, Lauren, Lori, and Lorraine. Another related name would be the Germanic Mythology name Lorelie which means "luring rock" and is mentioned in a German legend saying that a maiden named Lorelei, who lives upon a rock in Rhine River, lures fishermen into death by her songs.

Laurel may refer to:

People
Laurel Aitken (1927–2005), nicknamed the "Godfather of Ska"
Laurel Arnell-Cullen, British singer
Laurel Beckett, American biostatician
Laurel G. Bellows, American lawyer and former president of the American Bar Association
Laurel Burch (1945–2007), folk artist known for her brightly colored feline themes
Laurel Braitman (born 1978), American science historian and writer
Laurel Cronin (1939–1992), American actress
Laurel Clark (1961–2003), astronaut and doctor who flew on the last flight of the Space Shuttle Columbia
Laurel Collins (1984), Canadian politician
Laurel Griggs (2006–2019), American child actress
Laurel Edwards (born 1966), Australian television presenter
Laurel Halo, electronic musician
Laurell K. Hamilton, American author
Laurel Goodwin (1942–2022), American actress
Laurel Hester (1956–2006), American police lieutenant 
Laurel Holloman, American actress
Laurel Martyn (1916–2013), Australian ballerina
Laurel Massé (born 1951), American singer 
Laurel McGoff, actress
Laurel Lea Schaefer (born 1949), former Miss America titleholder
Laurel Schafer, Canadian organic chemist
Laurel Snyder, American poet
Laurel Thatcher Ulrich, an American historian
Laurel Nakadate, American visual artist
Laurel van der Wal (1927–2019), American aeronautical engineer
Laurel Rose Willson (1941–2002), discredited American author
Laurel Woodcock (1960–2017), Canadian artist and academic
Laurel Zuckerman (born 1960), American author

Fictional characters
Laurel Banning, a character from All My Children
Laurel Darkhaven, a character from the comic book series Rising Stars
Laurel-Ann Drummond, a character in the horror movie Pontypool
Laurel Gand, also known as Andromeda, a superheroine from DC Comics
Laurel Kent a superheroine from DC Comics
Laurel Lance, also known as Black Canary, a superheroine from DC Comics
Laurel Lance (Arrowverse), a character from the television series Arrow who was adapted from Laurel Lance
Laurel Limoges, a character from Privileged (TV series)
Laurel, the main character from the YA novel Wings (Aprilynne Pike)
Laurel Scott, from the film The Oscar
Laurel Thomas, a character on the soap opera Emmerdale
Laurel Yeung, from Edgemont (TV series)
Laurel Stevenson, from the novella/TV movie The Langoliers
Laurel Weaver, the mortician from Men in Black. Becomes Agent L.
Laurel Gray, a major character in the novel and film adaptation In a Lonely Place
Laurel, a secondary character in the children's picture book 10,000 Dresses
Laurel Castillo, from How to Get Away with Murder
Laurel Duglose, the late biological mother of protagonist Randal Pearson in This Is Us

See also
 Laurel (surname)

English feminine given names
English unisex given names
Given names derived from plants or flowers